Kelvin Boakye (born 6 June 1991) known by the stage name Serious Klein is a German-Ghanaian rapper born in Hannover, Germany that has emerged from the underground hip-hop scene in Germany.

Early life
Serious Klein was born in Hannover, Germany to Ghanaian parents. His mother (a single mother) works in Kindergarten and his father was a businessman who is now perhaps dead. His parents separated when he was 2 years old and they moved to Duisburg (North Rhine - Westphalia, Germany) at the age of 4. He later moved to Oer-Erkenschwick. Serious started writing music at the early age of 12. He recorded his first song when he was 14 years old through a school project with the former music label VJ-Style.

Music career
Serious Klein began performing under the name “key bee” which is short for his birth name Kelvin Boakye and changed his name to the present one in 2012. His mentor Ross Osei and his former in house producer Johannes "Shove Island" Altendorf took him under their wings and made him part of their own label DSTY records in 2009. He later formed the collective/label the family tree / 555 together with his manager Teddy Sarpong, His Tour Dj Dominik “Dayson” Antwi (in 2015) & his producer & long time collaborator Rascal.

Serious recorded his first EP "The Serious Outlook" in 2012 which helped him get recognized locally in Germany. After his first EP he did the following EPs "The Introduction“ in 2015 and “Summer 03's Problem" in 2016.

Serious released his debut album You Should've Known in 2018, out via Majestic Casual.

Discography

Studio albums
You Should've Known (August 2018)

EPs
The Introduction (June 17, 2015) 
Summer 03’s Problem  (August 2, 2016)

Singles

Notable performances & concerts
Serious Klein has also performed at the Esquire Awards which is to celebrate achievement of men and women in the middle east in Dubai 2017.

References

External links

1991 births
Living people
Alternative hip hop musicians
German people of Ghanaian descent
German rappers
Ghanaian rappers
Musicians from Hanover
21st-century male musicians